Sthenaropsidea is a genus of plant bugs in the family Miridae. There is one described species in Sthenaropsidea, S. mcateei.

References

Further reading

 
 
 

Phylini
Articles created by Qbugbot